Lackawanna Avenue Commercial Historic District is a national historic district located in Scranton, Lackawanna County, Pennsylvania. It encompasses 69 contributing buildings in a variety of architectural styles, including Late Victorian, Classical Revival, and Art Deco. The buildings are mostly three to four stories in height and three to five bays wide.  Located in the district and separately listed is the Dime Bank Building.

It was added to the National Register of Historic Places in 1983.

References

External links
 226 Lackawanna Avenue (Commercial Building), Scranton, Lackawanna County, PA: 2 photos, 5 data pages, and 1 photo caption page at Historic American Buildings Survey
 232 Lackawanna Avenue (Commercial Building), Scranton, Lackawanna County, PA: 3 photos, 5 data pages, and 1 photo caption page at Historic American Buildings Survey
 301-303 Lackawanna Avenue (Commercial Building), Scranton, Lackawanna County, PA: 8 photos, 5 data pages, and 2 photo caption pages at Historic American Buildings Survey
 304 Lackawanna Avenue (Commercial Building), Scranton, Lackawanna County, PA: 2 photos, 5 data pages, and 1 photo caption page at Historic American Buildings Survey
 305 Lackawanna Avenue (Commercial Building), Scranton, Lackawanna County, PA: 3 photos, 5 data pages, and 2 photo caption pages at Historic American Buildings Survey
 306-310 Lackawanna Avenue (Commercial Building), Scranton, Lackawanna County, PA: 4 photos, 5 data pages, and 1 photo caption page at Historic American Buildings Survey
 312-314 Lackawanna Avenue (Commercial Building), Scranton, Lackawanna County, PA: 3 photos, 5 data pages, and 1 photo caption page at Historic American Buildings Survey
 316-318 Lackawanna Avenue (Commercial Building), Scranton, Lackawanna County, PA: 3 photos, 5 data pages, and 1 photo caption page at Historic American Buildings Survey
 320 Lackawanna Avenue (Commercial Building), Scranton, Lackawanna County, PA: 3 photos, 5 data pages, and 1 photo caption page at Historic American Buildings Survey
 322 Lackawanna Avenue (Commercial Building), Scranton, Lackawanna County, PA: 2 photos, 5 data pages, and 1 photo caption page at Historic American Buildings Survey
 324 Lackawanna Avenue (Commercial Building), Scranton, Lackawanna County, PA: 4 photos, 5 data pages, and 1 photo caption page at Historic American Buildings Survey
 330 Lackawanna Avenue (Commercial Building), Scranton, Lackawanna County, PA: 2 photos, 5 data pages, and 1 photo caption page at Historic American Buildings Survey
 332-334 Lackawanna Avenue (Commercial Building), Scranton, Lackawanna County, PA: 3 photos, 5 data pages, and 1 photo caption page at Historic American Buildings Survey
 416 Lackawanna Avenue (Commercial Building), Scranton, Lackawanna County, PA: 3 photos, 5 data pages, and 1 photo caption page at Historic American Buildings Survey
 418 Lackawanna Avenue (Commercial Building), Scranton, Lackawanna County, PA: 2 photos, 5 data pages, and 1 photo caption page at Historic American Buildings Survey
 420 Lackawanna Avenue (Commercial Building), Scranton, Lackawanna County, PA: 2 photos, 6 data pages, and 1 photo caption page at Historic American Buildings Survey
 422 Lackawanna Avenue (Commercial Building), Scranton, Lackawanna County, PA: 3 photos, 5 data pages, and 1 photo caption page at Historic American Buildings Survey
 424 Lackawanna Avenue (Commercial Building), Scranton, Lackawanna County, PA: 3 photos, 5 data pages, and 1 photo caption page at Historic American Buildings Survey

Buildings and structures in Scranton, Pennsylvania
History of Lackawanna County, Pennsylvania
Historic districts on the National Register of Historic Places in Pennsylvania
Neoclassical architecture in Pennsylvania
Victorian architecture in Pennsylvania
National Register of Historic Places in Lackawanna County, Pennsylvania